Great Dayak (old spelling  ) was a component entity of the United States of Indonesia in Dayak regions on the island of Borneo.  It was established on 7 December 1946 with a temporary capital at Bandjermasin (Banjarmasin).  Great Dayak was dissolved on 18 April 1950 and became part of Kalimantan Province which was formed on 14 August 1950 with its capital also at Banjarmasin.  Following the division of Kalimantan Province, the former territory of Great Dayak was assigned first to South Kalimantan in 1956 and then Central Kalimantan in 1957 where it remains today.

Person of interests
 Helmuth Kunum

References

 Abdul Haris Nasution, Sekitar perang kemerdekaan Indonesia: Periode Renville (Volume 7 dari Sekitar perang kemerdekaan Indonesia), DISJARAH-AD, dan Penerbit Angkasa, 1991.

Indonesian National Revolution
States and territories established in 1946
States and territories disestablished in 1950